The 2012 Conference USA Men's Basketball Tournament  was held from March 7–10, 2012 at the FedExForum in Memphis, Tennessee. 

Seeding for the tournament was determined by the conference standings at the end of the regular season.  The winner of the tournament, Memphis, received the Conference USA automatic bid into the 2012 NCAA tournament.

Bracket

References

Conference USA men's basketball tournament
Tournament
Conference USA men's basketball tournament
Conference USA men's basketball tournament